Panesar-e Tashkan (also Romanized as Pānesār-e Tashkan; also known as Pānesār-e Bārānī and Bārānī) is a village in Teshkan Rural District, Chegeni District, Dowreh County, Lorestan Province, Iran. At the 2006 census, its population was 585, in 111 families.

References 

Towns and villages in Dowreh County